Musbury Castle is an Iron Age Hill fort situated above the Village of Musbury in Devon. The fort occupies a commanding hill top approx 175 Metres above Sea Level overlooking the Axe valley at Ordnance Survey .

References

Hill forts in Devon